Frederick Russell Moseley, Jr. (13 July 1913 in Brookline, Massachusetts – 10 March 1989) was an ice hockey player.  Moseley was named an All-American ice hockey while at Harvard University in 1934.  He was inducted into the United States Hockey Hall of Fame in 1975. He was later a banker with the firm J.P. Morgan & Co. rising from trainee to Executive Vice President.

External links
 United States Hockey bio

1913 births
1989 deaths
American men's ice hockey forwards
Harvard Crimson men's ice hockey players
Ice hockey players from Massachusetts
Sportspeople from Brookline, Massachusetts
United States Hockey Hall of Fame inductees